Vernes (sometimes called Agdenes) is a village in Orkland municipality in Trøndelag county, Norway. The village is located on the end of the Vernes peninsula which sits at junction of the Verrafjorden and the Trondheimsleia. The village is the site of the Agdenes Church and the Vernes ferry quay which has regular connections to the islands of Leksa, Storfosna, and Garten to the north.

References

Villages in Trøndelag
Orkland